Bussman and Bussmann are surnames. Notable persons with these surnames include the following people:

Gaëtan Bussmann (born 1991), French footballer
Jane Bussmann (born 1969), English comedian and author
Paul Bussman (born 1956), American politician
Philip Bussmann (born 1969), German video artist